The 1956–57 NBA season was the Pistons' ninth season in the NBA, 16th season as a franchise, and the final season for the team in Fort Wayne. 

The Pistons finished 34-38(.472), the first losing season in five years, finishing in a three-way tie for first in the Western Division, but were seeded third after the St. Louis Hawks defeated both the Pistons and the Minneapolis Lakers in tie-breaking games. In the West Semifinals, the Lakers eliminated the Pistons 2-0.  The team was led on the season by forward George Yardley (21.5 ppg, 10. rpg, NBA All-Star) and forward-center Mel Hutchins (12.4 ppg, 7.9 rpg, NBA All-Star).    

Following the season, the Pistons relocated to Detroit as owner Fred Zollner determined Fort Wayne was too small to support an NBA team. The state of Indiana would not get another pro basketball team until the Indiana Pacers of the ABA was formed in 1967, and then moved to the NBA with the NBA-ABA merger in 1976.

Regular season

Season standings

x – clinched playoff spot

Record vs. opponents

Game log

Playoffs

|- align="center" bgcolor="#ffcccc"
| 1
| March 14
| @ St. Louis
| L 103–115
| George Yardley (26)
| Hutchins, Foust (10)
| Kiel Auditorium
| 0–1
|-

|- align="center" bgcolor="#ffcccc"
| 1
| March 17
| @ Minneapolis
| L 127–131
| George Yardley (34)
| Minneapolis Auditorium
| 0–1
|- align="center" bgcolor="#ffcccc"
| 2
| March 19
| Minneapolis
| L 108–110
| Larry Foust (30)
| War Memorial Coliseum
| 0–2
|-

Awards and records
George Yardley, All-NBA Second Team

References

Detroit Pistons seasons
Fort Wayne